The Yamaha S80 is an 88-weighted-key synthesizer, produced by Yamaha Corporation.

It was released as Yamaha's flagship stage and studio synthesizer in 1999, and retailed for approximately US $3,000 before its discontinuation in 2002. It was superseded by the S90.

The tone generation module of the S30/S80 utilizes Yamaha's Advanced Wave Memory 2 algorithm (AWM2), providing 256 built-in voices and eight drum kits with a polyphony of 64 voices.

Notable users
 Faithless
 Sparks

References

External links
Yamaha Synth official site

S80
Polyphonic synthesizers
Digital synthesizers